The Saint Clement and Sisinnius inscription, written around the end of the eleventh century, is located in the subterranean chapel of the Basilica of San Clemente al Laterano in Rome. It is the very first example of the Italian language used in a work of art.

Content 
The inscription consists of the dialogue of the characters depicted on the fresco. In a scene taken from the Passio Sancti Clementis ("Martyrdom of Saint Clement"), a certain Sisinnius is instructing his servants to drag Saint Clement off to prison, unaware that the latter has escaped and that what they are dragging along is really a stone column.

The dialogue is as follows:

 Sisinnium: "Fili de le pute, traite! Gosmari, Albertel, traite! Falite dereto colo palo, Carvoncelle!"
 Sanctus Clemens: "Duritiam cordis vestris, saxa traere meruistis".

Or in English:

 Sisinnius: "Pull, you sons of bitches! Gosmario, Albertello, pull! Shove [the pole]  up his bottom, Carboncello!"
 Saint Clement: "You deserve to drag stone on account of the hardness of your hearts."

This is an early example of dialogue written next to the characters who speak it, a phenomenon that would later become common in comics.

Linguistic analysis 
Sisinnius and his workmen speak in an early form of Romanesco while Saint Clement expresses himself in Latin. This juxtaposition of the 'rude' vernacular with the 'holy' liturgical language is deliberate and meant to reflect the different moral standings of the characters involved.

Nevertheless, St. Clement's dialogue contains a number of mistakes. Duritiam, the accusative, is written instead of the ablative duritia; the form vestris is a mistake for vestri, likely by contamination with the ending of the preceding cordis; and finally, the letter h is missing from trahere.

The expression falite is composed of fa '', li '' and te '', an order that follows the so-called Tobler-Mussafia Law.

The name Carvoncelle, ultimately derived from Latin carbonem 'charcoal', shows the passage of /rb/ to /rv/, a change characteristic of Romanesco as well as other Central Italian dialects.

Notes

Bibliography 

 Migliorini, Bruno. 2007. Storia della lingua italiana. Milan: Bompiano.
 Bruni, Francesco. 1984. Elementi di storia della lingua e della cultura italiana. Turin: UTET.
 Baldelli, Ignazio & Vignuzzi, Ugo. 1985. Filologia, linguistuica, stilistica. In Letteratura italiana 4, vol. 4. Turin: Einaudi.
 Lupercini, Romano & Cataldi, Pietro & Marchiani, Lidia & Marchese, Franco. Il nuovo. La scrittura e l'interpretazione. Vol. 1. Palumbo editore.
 Migliorini, Bruno. 2007. Storia della lingua italiana. Milan: Bompiano.
 Politzer, Robert L. 1954. On the Central Italian development rv > rb. Italica 31. 93–98.

See also 

 Veronese riddle
 Placiti Cassinesi
 Commodilla catacomb inscription

External links 

 Pubblica Scuola
 Image and transcription by Luciano Zappella

Italian language
Latin inscriptions
11th-century inscriptions